Harold Clarence Tarala (November 14, 1927 – June 10, 1995) was a Canadian ice hockey player with the Penticton Vees. He won a gold medal at the 1955 World Ice Hockey Championships in West Germany. He also played professionally for the Kansas City Pla-Mors, Portland Penguins, Kansas City Mohawks, Portland Eagles, Vancouver Canucks, Syracuse Warriors, Springfield Indians, and New Westminster Royals.

References

1927 births
1995 deaths
Canadian ice hockey defencemen
Penticton Vees players